Giddy Up is the first solo CD released by Craig Northey, a former member of the Canadian 1990's alternative band Odds. It was released in 2001 and has eight songs, totaling a running time of approximately 25 minutes. Other composers who contributed to the album include David Gamson and Blair Packham.

"Take a Hit Off This"
"Slow Motion"
"Giddy Up"
"After Walking in Space"
"Famous Grave"
"Old Mistakes"
"Write It in Lightning"
"Sons & Daughters"
 
"Write It in Lightning" was written for The Who, who bought the rights to record the song; however, the song remains unreleased by The Who.

2001 albums
Craig Northey albums